The Canon AL-1 was an FD mount, 35mm single-lens reflex camera introduced in March 1982.  Its main feature was the "Quick Focus" focus-assist system that was aimed at those who had trouble focusing through the viewfinder—either novices, or those with poor eyesight—and was intended to head off competition from the first full-autofocus cameras from other manufacturers, such as the Pentax ME F.

Features
As a lower-end camera, the AL-1 did not offer a long list of features. Instead, Canon focused on providing core functionality and lowering price. The AL-1 provides focus-confirmation, aperture-priority autoexposure (controlled by a through-the-lens silicon photocell), manual shutter speeds from 1/15 to 1/1000 of a second, and a 10 second self-timer. It also added a larger grip, and the convenience of using of AAA cells for power. However the battery door is one of its weakness as most of the cameras that are found today on the market have a battery door that is broken or has been replaced. Its body was constructed from a special polycarbonate that was then painted to imitate metal. An ISO hotshoe, A-series power winder connections, and cable-release socket provide an acceptable level of compatibility with accessories. It was also the last SLR camera to carry Canon's 1960s-era logo on the pentaprism.

The camera uses Canon's breech-lock FD mount, and so users could choose from the wide variety of Canon FD lenses, as well as those from third parties. Users could also utilise Canon R and FL lenses, but with some limitations.

In 1987, Canon abandoned the FD mount in favour of the EF mount along with the EOS camera system, which uses the same concept as the T80 but with a new and incompatible mount designed around an all-electronic interface.

Autofocus

The AL-1 marked Canon's first public foray into autofocus technology. While far from a true autofocus system, the camera acted a test for Canon engineers to evaluate phase detection for SLR cameras. The QF focus-assist system uses traditional phase detection linear CCD arrays in the base of the camera. Light is diverted to these sensors through a partially silvered mirror.  When the light of the subject is in phase, the image is in focus.  Below the viewfinder image, two red arrows indicate which direction to turn the focusing ring to achieve focus.  Optimum focus is indicated by a green light (circle) between the two arrows.  Contrast detection is the system used for autofocus on most compact digital cameras in recent years.
  
Due to the camera's lack of features, it was never overly popular and so it would be 1985 before Canon expanded on the concept, even though its competitors raced ahead. In 1983 Nikon introduced the F3AF, a special version of their pro-series F3, which used a special viewfinder with a built-in autofocus system connecting electronically to a motor in the lens. In 1985 Minolta introduced the Maxxum 7000 (Dynax 7000 in Europe and Asia), the world's first body-integrated autofocus SLR.  Canon reacted to this with the T80, which integrated the focus system into the body and, as with the F3AF, connected electronically with a motor in the lens.

External links
YouTube video describing the function of the focusing element in the Canon AL-1
Canon AL-1 (QF) Quick Focus Information Page

AL-1